George Fergusson may refer to:

 George Fergusson (diplomat) (born 1955), British diplomat
 George Fergusson, Lord Hermand (1743–1827), Scottish judge

See also
 George Ferguson (disambiguation)